South Carolina Highway 115 (SC 115) was a state highway that existed entirely in the northwestern part of Union. It connected West Springs with Jonesville.

Route description
SC 115 began at an intersection with U.S. Route 176 (US 176; now SC 215) in West Springs. It traveled to the northeast and met SC 112 (now Meansville Road) in Mean Crossroads. It continued to the northeast and reached its northern terminus, an intersection with SC 9 in Jonesville.

History
The next year, it was extended to its southern terminus in West Springs. It was decommissioned in 1947. Its path was downgraded to secondary roads. Today, it is known as West Springs Highway.

Major intersections

See also

References

External links
Former SC 115 at the Virginia Highways South Carolina Annex

115
Transportation in Union County, South Carolina